Anthems of the Damned is the debut full-length studio album by Israeli thrash metal band Hammercult, released on April 20, 2012 through Sonic Attack Records. The album was produced by the band's guitarist Arie Aranovich and mixed by former Hatesphere vocalist Jacob Bredahl.

The album included a digital bonus track of Hammercult covering classic Accept song 'Fast As a Shark'.

In June 2013 SPV re-released 'Anthems Of The Damned' on a limited edition red vinyl version which included 3 new bonus songs.

Track listing

Personnel
Yakir Shochat - vocals
Arie Aranovich - guitars
Guy Ben-David - guitars
Elad Manor - bass, vocals
Maayan Henik - drums

Additional personnel
Jacob Bredahl (ex-Hatesphere) - guest vocals on "Black Horseman"

References

External links
http://metalist.co.il/NewsPrivate.asp?id=4053

2012 debut albums
Hammercult albums
Albums with cover art by Eliran Kantor